Daniel L. Kastner (born 1951) is an American physician and researcher specialising in the genetics of autoinflammatory disorders. He is scientific director of the National Human Genome Research Institute, where he is a National Institutes of Health Distinguished Investigator. He was awarded the 2021 Crafoord Prize for Polyarthritis for his pioneering work on autoinflammatory diseases.

Early life and education
Kastner was born in Lockport, NY, in 1951.

Kastner earned a BA in philosophy from Princeton University in 1973.  and an MD and PhD from Baylor College of Medicine.

Career
His research there "has focused on using genetic and genomic strategies to understand inherited disorders of inflammation".

His work has led to the recognition and treatment of a range of autoinflammatory disorders. In 1987 his was one of two teams which simultaneously discovered and published the genetic mutation which causes FMF, and since then he has worked on disorders including TRAPS and DADA2. In 2020 he was one of the authors of the paper which first described the VEXAS syndrome.   he is working on Behçet's disease.

 Kastner has said that he plans to leave his post of scientific director at NHGRI "in the next few months". He will continue to work with the 3,000 patients in his clinic, and "find yet more disease genes, understand how they work, and develop new treatments."

The chair of the Crafoord Prize committee, said in 2021:Dan Kastner is often called the father of autoinflammatory diseases, a title that he thoroughly deserves. His discoveries have taught us a great deal about the immune system and its functions, contributing to effective treatments that reduce the symptoms of diseases from which patients previously suffered enormously, sometimes leading to premature death

Honors and recognition
Kastner was elected to the National Academy of Sciences in 2010 and to the National Academy of Medicine in 2012.

In 2018 Kastner was named "Federal Employee of the Year" in the Samuel J. Heyman Service to America Medals ("the Sammies"). and in 2019 he won the Ross Prize for Molecular Medicine.

He was awarded the 2021 Crafoord Prize in Polyarthritis, with the citation "for establishing the concept of autoinflammatory diseases".

References

External links

 

1951 births
Date of birth missing (living people)
Place of birth missing (living people)
Living people
Princeton University alumni
Baylor College of Medicine alumni
National Institutes of Health people
Members of the United States National Academy of Sciences
Members of the National Academy of Medicine
People from Lockport, New York
American medical researchers
American geneticists